Zinc finger, CCHC domain containing 23 is a protein that in humans is encoded by the ZCCHC23 gene.

References 

Human proteins